Eupithecia tribunaria is a moth in the family Geometridae. It was first recorded in Elizabethpol,  which was then in the Russian Empire and is now part of Azerbaijan.

References

Moths described in 1852
tribunaria
Moths of Asia
Moths of Europe